Wallace Triplett (April 18, 1926 – November 8, 2018) was a professional American football player, the first African-American draftee to play for a National Football League team. For that reason, his portrait hangs in the Pro Football Hall of Fame in Canton, Ohio.

Early life
Triplett, the son of a postal worker, was born and raised in the Philadelphia suburb of La Mott, Pennsylvania, part of Cheltenham Township. His reputation as a talented high school football player, combined with his upscale address, prompted the University of Miami to offer him a scholarship sight unseen, under the assumption Triplett was white. The then-segregated university rescinded the scholarship whey discovered Triplett was black. Triplett instead earned a Senatorial Scholarship for his academics and chose to attend Penn State University in the fall of 1945.

Penn State
Along with Dennis Hoggard, Triplett was one of the first African-Americans to take the field in a varsity football game for the Penn State Nittany Lions. During the 1946 season, the Penn State team voted to cancel a regular-season game in Miami against the Miami Hurricanes, rather than compromise by not bringing their black players. (Miami, like other southern schools at the time, refused to compete against integrated schools unless they left their black players at home.)

In 1948, Triplett became the first African-American to play in the Cotton Bowl Classic, catching the tying touchdown in Penn State's 13–13 tie with Southern Methodist University.

Triplett also co-founded the Gamma Nu chapter of Alpha Phi Alpha while at Penn State. Triplett returned to Penn State on November 11, 2015, to meet with head coach James Franklin and the team after their bye-week scrimmage.

NFL
Although Triplett was the third African-American chosen in the 1949 NFL Draft, he was the first of the draftees to take the field in a league game. Undrafted "free agent" African-Americans had previously played in the league. The 5'-10", 173-pound running back and return specialist played for the Detroit Lions from 1949 to 1950.

On October 29, 1950, in a game against the Los Angeles Rams, Triplett set the Lions' single-game record for kickoff return yardage with 294 yards, the third-highest total (NFL record is 304 yards) in NFL history, including a 97-yard touchdown return.

Later life and death
Following the 1950 season, Triplett became the first NFL player drafted into military service for the Korean War. When he returned from active duty, the Lions traded him to the Chicago Cardinals. He retired from professional football in 1953. After his playing days, Triplett worked as a teacher, in the insurance business, and in management for the Chrysler Corporation. Triplett died on November 8, 2018, at age 92.

References

External links
 

1926 births
2018 deaths
African-American players of American football
American football return specialists
American football running backs
Detroit Lions players
Chicago Cardinals players
Penn State Nittany Lions football players
People from Cheltenham, Pennsylvania
Players of American football from Pennsylvania
Businesspeople from Pennsylvania
20th-century American businesspeople
20th-century African-American sportspeople
21st-century African-American people